Parliamentary elections were held in Iceland on 29 October 2016. They were due to be held on or before 27 April 2017, but following the 2016 Icelandic anti-government protests, the ruling coalition announced that early elections would be held "in autumn".

The Independence Party emerged as the largest in the Althing, winning 21 of the 63 seats; the Progressive Party, which had won the most seats in 2013, lost more than half its seats as it was overtaken by the Left-Green Movement and the Pirate Party. Of the 63 elected MPs, 30 were female, giving Iceland the highest proportion of female MPs in Europe.

A new coalition was formed on 10 January 2017, consisting of the Independence Party, the Reform Party and Bright Future, with Bjarni Benediktsson becoming Prime Minister on 11 January 2017.

Background
In early April 2016, following revelations in the Panama Papers, leaks from law firm Mossack Fonseca about the financial dealings of then Prime Minister Sigmundur Davíð Gunnlaugsson (Progressive Party) and his wife, there were calls for an early election from the opposition, who planned to present him with a motion of no confidence. Mass protests calling on the Prime Minister to quit followed. Although Sigmundur Davíð had stated he had no intention of resigning, he apparently resigned on 5 April. However, it was later stated by the Prime Minister's office that he had only taken a temporary leave of absence from his duties. The Progressive Party's deputy leader, Sigurður Ingi Jóhannsson, became acting Prime Minister the same day.

The President, Olafur Ragnar Grimsson, then said he would speak to both coalition parties, Progressive Party and Independence Party, before considering whether to call new elections. Opposition parties continued to press for new elections. On 6 April, Sigurður announced, "We expect to have elections this autumn." On 11 August, Bjarni Benediktsson met with opposition parties and later announced that elections would be held on 29 October 2016.

Electoral system
The 63 members of the Althing were elected using open list proportional representation in multi-member constituencies of 10 to 11 seats. Of the 63 seats, 54 were elected using constituency results and determined using the d'Hondt method. The remaining nine supplementary seats were awarded to parties that crossed the 5% national electoral threshold in order to give them a total number of seats equivalent to their national share of the vote.

Participating parties

The final deadline for parties to apply for participation in the parliamentary election was 14 October 2016.

Parties with a list for all constituencies
Bright Future, list letter A
Progressive Party, list letter B
Reform, list letter C
Independence Party, list letter D
People's Party, list letter F
Social Democratic Alliance, list letter S
Dawn, list letter T
Left-Green Movement, list letter V
Pirate Party, list letter P

Parties with a list for only some constituencies 
Humanist Party in Reykjavík South, list letter H
People's Front of Iceland in all constituencies apart from the Northwest, list letter R
Icelandic National Front in the South and Northwest constituencies, list letter E

Campaign 
Sigurður Ingi replaced Sigmundur Davíð as the party chairman of the Progressive Party on 2 October 2016.

The Pirate Party announced on 16 October 2016 that they would not participate in post-election negotiations to form a coalition government with either the Progressive Party or the Independence Party. The party did send letters to Reform, Bright Future, Social Democratic Alliance and Left-Green Movement about the possibility of forming an alliance prior to the election.

Opinion polls

Results
Voter turnout was the lowest turnout in Iceland's history.

Government formation
Neither of the two main blocs — the outgoing coalition of the Independence Party and the Progressives, or the centre-left opposition (Left-Greens, Pirates, Bright Future and Social Democrats) — secured an overall majority, leaving the new centrist party Reform as possible kingmakers.

The leader of the Independence Party, Bjarni Benediktsson, expressed preference for a three-party coalition, although without saying which three parties. The Pirate Party proposed a five-party coalition with the Left-Green Movement, the Social Democrats, Bright Future and Reform, having previously ruled out working with either of the two outgoing coalition members. The Pirate Party then suggested a minority coalition of Left-Green Movement, Bright Future and Reform, with outside support from themselves and the Social Democrats, in order to simplify the process of government formation.

The leader of Reform ruled out a right-leaning three-party coalition with the Independence Party and the Progressives, and did not rule out supporting the centre-left bloc.

On 2 November, President Guðni Th. Jóhannesson gave the mandate to Bjarni to form a majority government. On 11 November, the Independence Party, Reform and Bright Future entered into formal coalition talks, but the three parties failed to agree with a new market-based fishing quota system and an EU referendum as the main stumbling blocks.

On 17 November, the mandate to form a majority government was in turn given to the leader of the Left-Greens, Katrín Jakobsdóttir. She instigated talks with Reform, Bright Future, the Pirates, and Social Democrats, and on 19 November the five parties agreed to start formal coalition talks. On 24 November, the coalition talks fell through and Katrín formally renounced the Presidential mandate to form a government.

On 2 December, the mandate to form a majority government was given to the leader of the Pirate Party, Birgitta Jónsdóttir. The Pirates were unable to form a government and the President chose not to give a new mandate to form a government, but asked the party leaders to discuss the matter informally.

On 2 January 2017, the Independence Party started official talks about a possible coalition deal with the Reform Party and Bright Future. Morgunblaðið also reported that the Left-Green Movement and the Progressive Party had also discussed possible coalition deals with the Independence Party. A new coalition was formed on 10 January 2017 between Independence Party, Reform Party and the Bright Future with Bjarni Benediktsson becoming Prime Minister on 11 January 2017.

Footnotes

References

Iceland
Parliament
Iceland
Parliamentary elections in Iceland